Phaeoxantha cruciata is a species of tiger beetle in the subfamily Cicindelinae that was described by Brulle in 1837. The species is common in Argentina, Bolivia, Brazil, Paraguay, and Uruguay.

References

Beetles described in 1837
Beetles of South America
Taxa named by Gaspard Auguste Brullé